Sahara is a 1983 British-American adventure drama film directed by Andrew McLaglen and starring Brooke Shields, Lambert Wilson, Horst Buchholz, John Rhys-Davies and John Mills. The original music score was composed by Ennio Morricone.

Plot
In 1928, Gordon (Steve Forrest) develops a new racing vehicle, a hot rod, but dies in a practice run before he can compete in the 'Trans-African Auto Race'. To save her father's dream, and win the prize money, Gordon's flapper daughter, Dale (Brooke Shields) disguises herself as a man and takes the place of her father in the race through the Sahara Desert, with the help of her father's friends.

Dale is an excellent driver and has a good chance to win the male-only race. After she crosses the start line, she takes off her wig and mustache and reveals her true sex to the other participants in the race. While taking a short-cut, she comes close to a tribal war between Bedouin factions. Another racer, the German Von Glessing (Horst Buchholz), also takes the same short-cut in order to supply weapons to the evil leader of the two warring tribes.

Dale and her crew are captured by Rasoul (John Rhys-Davies), the uncle of the good leader of the warring tribes. The good leader, Sheikh Jaffar (Lambert Wilson), had seen Dale from afar and desired her, so he rescues her from his uncle by claiming Dale as his bride. Dale marries Jaffar and escapes the next morning in her car to attempt to finish the race. She is captured by the evil leader before she can complete the race, but a stowaway gypsy child runs back to Jaffar to tell him of Dale's capture. Meanwhile, Dale is thrown into a pit of leopards. Jaffar rallies his men, rescues her and allows her to return to drive in the race. Dale wins the race, and when celebrating sees Jaffar's horse nearby. She bids farewell to her crew, mounts the horse, and returns to Jaffar.

Cast
 Brooke Shields as Dale Gordon
 Lambert Wilson as Sheikh Ahmed Al Jaffar
 Horst Buchholz as Heinrich Von Glessing
 John Rhys-Davies as Rasoul
 John Mills as Cambridge
 Ronald Lacey as Beg
 Cliff Potts as String
 Perry Lang as Andy
 Terrence Hardiman as Captain Brownie
 Steve Forrest as R. J. Gordon
 Tuvia Tavi as Enrico Bertocelli
 David Lodge as Ewing
 Paul Maxwell as Chase
 Yosef Shiloach as Halef

Production

Development
The film was supposedly inspired by the then British Prime Minister's son, Mark Thatcher, who became lost in North Africa in 1982 during an auto rally. It also came about due to the box office success of Raiders of the Lost Ark and Menahem Golan's fondness for the Rudolph Valentino film The Sheik (1921).

In May 1982 it was announced Guy Hamilton would direct Brooke Shields in Sahara with a $15 million budget.  It was one of the biggest budgeted films from Cannon Films.

Shields' fee was reportedly $1 million or $1.5 million. Her mother Teri Shields was executive producer with a fee of $25,000.

Teri said she wanted the film "to be cute and light and I wanted a fatherly director, who would play with her, smack her around, have fun. I don’t want anyone looking at her like a woman yet. It’s not time.” There were reportedly eight rewrites at the behest of Shields' mother and two directors quit before filming started.

Finding the male lead took over a year. “I wanted someone as handsome as could be with an unusual accent,” said Teri. Among those considered were Ted McGinley (“I darkened his hair and had him grow a beard, but he couldn’t get the accent” said Teri); Adnan Khashoggi's son Khaled (“He is a gorgeous boy, but he’s not an actor”); and John Kennedy Jr. (“He’s dark, handsome as hell and what a physique, but can you imagine the press if he co-starred with Brooke? The film would get lost. Besides, I didn’t think his mother would let him”). Vincent Spano, who had played a character called "The Sheik" in Baby It's You said he was offered the role but turned it down. "I wondered if it would be good for my career to play another sheik," he said. "Also, didn't want to be standing around in the Sahara Desert waiting for Brooke to fix her eyelashes." Eventually Lambert Wilson got the role.

"Brooke is the most beautiful creature on earth," said Golan. "She is the genie of the desert and Lambert is a wildman, but educated. He wants to rape her, but he controls himself. We are not afraid here of clichés. I want a beautiful romantic blockbuster where all American kids will identify.”

Shooting
Filming began in August with Andrew McLaglen as director. Sahara was partially filmed in the Negev Desert of southern Israel near the city of Elat.

The fashions were designed by Valentino, who said 1925 was one of his favourite years: "It was a fantastic moment, full of fantasy and ideas. A time when women changed for tea, and then for dinner and then for a ball."

Shields later said, "It was fun being in Israel for four months and driving a car." She was injured during filming when she was thrown from a car she was driving, landing on her back and bruising her ribs. She stated that this incident was the closest she'd ever come to death.

Filming ended in February 1983, after which Shields enrolled in Princeton University.

"It was enjoyable to be in the Negev desert and in Eilat and sort of in the Dead Sea, but the experience of it and living there for that long was definitely more memorable than the movie itself was," said Shields.

Reception
The film was meant to come out in December 1983. The release was delayed until February 1984. "We couldn't get the theatres we wanted at Christmas so the decision was to wait," said an MGM/UA spokesman. Other reports said the decision to push back a release were made after poor previews.

It was released only in the West Coast states. "We decided to open it in half the country to see what we had," said MGM.

It made $550,848 on 344 theaters on the West Coast - a per screen average of only $1,601. The Chicago Tribune called the film "a dog" It ended up making $1.2 million.

Accolades
At the 1984 Razzies, Brooke Shields was nominated for Worst Actress and won Worst Supporting Actor as "Brooke Shields (with a moustache)", making her the first and only actress to win this award.

One of the cars made for the film, a replica 1932 Hispano-Suiza H6C, was put up for auction in 2015.

References

External links
 
 
 
 
Review of film at Variety

1983 films
1980s adventure drama films
1983 romantic drama films
American adventure drama films
American romantic drama films
American auto racing films
British adventure drama films
British romantic drama films
1980s English-language films
Films scored by Ennio Morricone
Films directed by Andrew McLaglen
Films set in 1927
Films set in Africa
Films set in deserts
Films shot in England
Films shot in Israel
Golden Raspberry Award winning films
American interfaith romance films
Metro-Goldwyn-Mayer films
Golan-Globus films
1980s historical drama films
American historical drama films
British historical drama films
Films produced by Menahem Golan
Films with screenplays by Menahem Golan
Films produced by Yoram Globus
Flappers
1980s American films
Films set in the Sahara
1980s British films